Nia is the debut studio album by American hip hop duo Blackalicious. It was released in Europe by Mo' Wax on August 30, 1999, and later re-released in the United States by Quannum Projects on February 29, 2000, with a slightly altered track listing.

Critical reception

John Bush of AllMusic called Nia "an album that stakes the claim of Chief Xcel and Gift of Gab as not only the best pair of rappers in the underground, but also the best pair of producers." Patrick Jones of PopMatters commented that it "renews your faith in the power and potential of hip-hop." Nathan Rabin of The A.V. Club said, "Blackalicious' work will strike some listeners as hopelessly naïve and New Age-ish, but Nia is nevertheless an audacious, uncompromised, enormously promising album by a group with the courage to disregard hip-hop's codes and unwritten rules to create music that is vitally, distinctly its own." Exclaim!s Del F. Cowie praised the album's "superior conceptual execution and soulful statement".

NME placed it at number 45 on the "101 Albums to Hear Before You Die" list.

Track listing

Charts

References

External links
 
 

1999 debut albums
Blackalicious albums
Mo' Wax albums
Quannum Projects albums
Albums produced by DJ Shadow